Yvonne Vandekerckhove (12 November 1920 – 13 November 2012) was a Belgian swimmer. She competed in the women's 200 metre breaststroke at the 1948 Summer Olympics.

References

External links
 

1920 births
2012 deaths
Belgian female breaststroke swimmers
Olympic swimmers of Belgium
Swimmers at the 1948 Summer Olympics
Sportspeople from Ostend